Swansea Central police station is a 21st-century-designed building, located on the former Swansea Fire Station site in Alexandra Road, near Swansea Magistrates Court, Swansea. The police station is the area headquarters for the Western Division of South Wales Police.

Old Swansea Central Police station
The former city-centre police station in Swansea is a Grade II listed building, also situated in Alexandra Road. In 2003 it was acquired by the housing association, Grŵp Gwalia Cyf, and was redeveloped into Llys Glas. It provides  student accommodation for Swansea Metropolitan University, an art gallery and a conference studio.

References

Grade II listed buildings in Swansea
Grade II listed government buildings
Police stations in Wales